The fourth season of La Voz Argentina premiered on 5 June 2022, on Telefe. Marley reprised his role as the host of the show, while singer and actress Rochi Igarzabal became the digital host.

Soledad Pastorutti, Ricardo Montaner, Mau y Ricky and Lali Espósito returned as coaches.

This season featured a new element: the Block. Added during the Blind auditions, this button allows the coach to block another one from getting an artist. Also, the number of team members was increased from 24 to 28 artists.

On September 12, Yhosva Montoya was named winner of the season, marking Soledad Pastorutti's third win as a coach.

Coaches and host

As in the previous season, Marley is the host of the show. This season introduced singer and actress Rochi Igarzabal as the digital host of the show. All four coaches from the previous season returned: Venezuelan-Argentine singer and songwriter Ricardo Montaner, folk singer Soledad Pastorutti, pop singer Lali Espósito, and Venezuelan Latin pop and reggaeton duo Mau y Ricky. In this season, it was announced that the fifth coach for "The Comeback Stage" would be the Argentine Latin pop duo MYA.

Teams

Blind auditions

Battles 
The battles began airing on July 18, 2022. The advisors for this round were Palito Ortega for Team Montaner, Karina for Team Soledad, Manuel Turizo for Team Mau & Rikcy, and Álex Ubago for Team Lali. 

In this round, the coaches pit two of their artists in a singing match and then select one of them to advance to the next round. Losing artists may be "stolen" by another coach, becoming new members of their team.

Knockouts 
The Knockouts will be airing on August 7, 2022. The mentors for this season's knockouts will be Alejandro Lerner for Team Montaner, Diego Torres for Team Soledad, FMK for Team Mau & Ricky, and Mateo Sujatovich for Team Lali.

In this round, each coach pairs two of their artists in a singing match. The artists themselves will select the song they will sing in the round. The coach will then select one of the artists to advance to the Live Playoffs. Each coach can steal two losing artist from another team during the Knockouts.

Playoffs 
During each of the four Playoff nights, the ten artists from each team will perform. At the end of each round, each coach will choose four artists to advance and the other four will be saved by the public. The top 32 artists advanced to the next round.

The Comeback Stage 
For this season, the show again added a phase of competition called The Comeback Stage, exclusive to MiTelefe mobile app, La Voz Argentina YouTube channel, Instagram TV, Facebook, Twitter, and Telefe.com. Fifth coach MYA selected artists who did not turn a chair during the Blind auditions as well as eliminated artists from later rounds of the competition.

First round 
During the first round of competition, the twelve selected artists went head to head, two artists per episode, and MYA selected a winner to move on to the next round.

Second round 
In the second round, MYA brought back three artists who were eliminated during the main competition Battles, giving them a chance to re-enter in the competition. These artists faced off against the six artists from the first round.

Third round 
In the third round, the three remaining artists and three artists who were eliminated during the main competition Knockouts performed in front of MYA and four were selected to perform in a fourth round.

Fourth round 
In the fourth round, the four remaining artists performed in front of MYA and three were selected to perform in a fifth and final round. However, at the end of the competition the four artists were chosen to return.

Final round (Lives' Round of 33) 
The contestants performed in the first night of the round of 33 for the main competition, with the winner officially joining one of the four main teams. Naiquén Galizio was chosen as the winner by the public's vote and she decided to join Ricardo Montaner's team.

Live shows

Round of 33

Round of 25

Quarterfinals

Semifinals

Elimination chart

Color key 
Artist's info

  Team Montaner
  Team Soledad
  Team Mau y Ricky
  Team Lali

Result details

  Winner
  Runner-up
  Third place
  Fourth place
  Saved by the public
  Eliminated

Overall

Notes

References

Argentina
2012 Argentine television seasons